The Gambalang are an indigenous Australian people of the Northern Territory.

Language
Though many speakers now use Bininj Kunwok dialect in their daily  lives, their ancestral language Gambalang belongs to the Gunwinggic branch of the non-Pama-Nyungan Macro-Gunwinyguan languages.

Country
Norman Tindale estimate their tribal territory as covering some  On the coast between Hawkesbury Point and Junction Bay.
To their east across the estuary opening out into the Arafura Sea were the Gunavidji, the Gungorogone lay southeast, while the Kunwinjku were to their immediate south, on the west bank of the Liverpool River.

Notable people
 Xavier Clarke, Australian rules footballer.

Alternative names
 Gunbalang
 Gunbulan
 Walang

Notes

Citations

Sources

Aboriginal peoples of the Northern Territory